Tazza: The High Rollers is a 2006 South Korean crime film directed by Choi Dong-hoon and based on Huh Young-man and Kim Se-yeong's manhwa of the same name. Produced by Sidus FNH and distributed by CJ Entertainment, the story revolves around a group of gambling drifters involved in the Korean card game Hwatu (lit. War of Flowers). It was a huge commercial and critical success, becoming one of South Korea's highest-grossing films and winning numerous awards. It was the 2nd best-selling film of 2006 in South Korea, with 6,847,777 admissions nationwide.

Plot
In 1994, Goni(Original name Kim gon),a recent university graduate, has lost his entire savings, and money stolen from his family(his older sister), after being swindled by professional cheat gamblers(Park moo sik and Kwak Cheol Yong). In order to regain the money,from 1994 to 1995, Goni begins training in the art of trickery under one of the best gamblers in the country, Mr. Pyeong(also translated as Officer Pyeong.He is the top three gamblers along with Agwi of Jeolla province and JJakgwi(One ear) of Gyeongsang Province). He becomes well-known, wandering about different gambling places throughout the country with Pyeong. Madam Jeong, who runs an illegal gambling operation and plays the role of the architect of setting the plot in their gambling fraud schemes, begins to show interest in Goni.Over some philosophical differences in the art of gambling, Goni leaves Pyeong and begins working for Jeong, whom he also has a love tryst with. A ooncerned Pyeong, tries to discourage Goni to leave the gambling scene by cutting his finger, but while Goni tries to cut fingers, he accdidentally meets Agwi, who is known to kill his opponents after a gambling match with him. While in his usual gambling operations, Goni receives a call that Mr Pyeong was found dead with his wrist sliced off(initially implied to be a result of losing the match against Agwi, as Agwi murders his opponent.). An angry Goni,full of revenge, prepares to have a proper match with Agwi to beat him. While he was having another gambling match that  leads to the arrest of madam Jung, he meets another cardsharp Ko gwang ryol, who joins the dream team that would help Goni's match with Agwi.Goni meets JJakgwi who he learns the art of lying from. Goni also develops a relationship with Hwa ran, and delivers money to his family. Before he meets Agwi, he tries to beat Kwak cheol yong by beating at his own game, but is later caught, but goni averses the risk by murdering Kwak cheolyong's squad in an impromtu car accident.Meanwhile raccoon finds that Madam jeong is the reall killer of Mr pyeong, who ordered her bodyguard to kill for him.Ko gwang ryeol matches with Agwi and gets hurt. Goni finally gets a match with agwi, with madam jeong helping goni, and leads to Agwi losing the bet. However, as the game progresses it was revealed goni has suspected madam jeong making agwi and madam jeong lose all the things they have.After a fight in the train, goni mysteriously disappears.Goni hiding his previous life ends with involving in another form of gambling.

Cast
Cho Seung-woo as Kim Goni
Kim Hye-soo as Madam Jeong
Yoo Hae-jin as Ko Gwang-ryeol
Baek Yoon-sik as Mr. Pyeong
Kim Yoon-seok as Agui
Kim Eung-soo as Kwak Cheol-yong
Kim Sang-ho as Park Moo-seok
Lee Soo-kyung as Hwa-ran
Park Soo-young as Go Ni's Uncle	
Kim Jung-nan as Se-ran
 Jo Sang-geon as Raccoon (detective)
Huh Young-man (cameo)

Home media
5 Points Pictures gave the film a two-disc DVD release in North America on September 18, 2012. The film is subtitled and includes nearly 3 hours of bonus features, including the making of the film, a comparison between the film and its source manhwa, and gambling tricks explained by a former professional gambler.

Sequels

A sequel, titled Tazza: The Hidden Card, was directed by Kang Hyeong-cheol and starred Choi Seung-hyun, Shin Se-kyung, Kwak Do-won and Lee Ha-nui, with Yoo Hae-jin and Kim Yoon-seok reprising their roles. It began filming on January 2, 2014, and was released on September 3, 2014.

A second sequel, Tazza: One Eyed Jack, was released in 2019. It was directed by Kwon Oh-kwang and stars Park Jung-min and Ryoo Seung-bum.

Awards and nominations

References

External links 
 
 
 

2006 films
2006 crime drama films
South Korean crime drama films
Films about gambling
Films about hanafuda
Films based on manhwa
Films based on works by Huh Young-man
Films directed by Choi Dong-hoon
CJ Entertainment films
2000s Korean-language films
Live-action films based on comics
2006 drama films
Grand Prize Paeksang Arts Award (Film) winners
2000s South Korean films